is a Japanese manga written and illustrated by Hiroko Minami. The Japan Cartoonist Association awarded Hina-chan no Nichijo its 2008 Grand Prize of the Japan Cartoonists Association Award along with Naoki Urasawa's 20th Century Boys.

Manga
The manga was written and illustrated by Hiroko Minami. Sankei Shimbun published the manga's four bound volumes between March 2005 and March 2009.

Volume listing

References